Sumit Khatri (born 15 July 1989) is an Indian first-class cricketer who represented Rajasthan. He made his first-class debut for Rajasthan in the 2006-07 Ranji Trophy on 10 January 2007.

References

External links
 

1989 births
Living people
Indian cricketers
Rajasthan cricketers